Schizoporella unicornis is a species of bryozoans in the family Schizoporellidae.  Species have been found intertidally around oyster beds in  Georgia.  However, the origins of this species are likely from British Columbia.

References

External links
 Image
 Alien Bryozoan

Cheilostomatida
Animals described in 1844